Steven L. Reed (born 1974) is an American jurist, politician, and the mayor of Montgomery, Alabama. A member of the Democratic Party, he was a probate judge in Montgomery County.

Early life and education
Steven L. Reed was born in Montgomery, Alabama to Joe and Mollie Reed (née Perry) as one of three children. His father, Joe, was one of the first class of elected members of the Montgomery City Council from 1975 to 1999. Steven Reed earned a Bachelor of Arts from Morehouse College and a Master of Business Administration from Vanderbilt University.

Reed is a member of the Omega Psi Phi fraternity, having been initiated into its Theta Alpha graduate chapter in 1998.

Early career
He was a financial analyst, then changed careers and lobbied the Alabama legislature, and worked for Lieutenant Governor Jim Folsom Jr.

Reed was elected as probate judge in 2012.  In February 2015, he was the first probate judge in the state of Alabama who started issuing same-sex marriage licenses after district judge Callie V. Granade struck the state's ban on same-sex marriage, defying Alabama Chief Justice Roy Moore. In March 2015, after a ruling by the Alabama Supreme Court, he stopped issuing them.

Mayor of Montgomery 
Reed ran for mayor of Montgomery in the 2019 election, and defeated his opponent David Woods in a runoff. He was officially sworn in as mayor on November 12, 2019. Prior to being sworn in, Reed took part in a prayer service at the historic Dexter Avenue Baptist Church, which gained notoriety at the start of the Civil rights movement for leading the Montgomery bus boycott. Reed was intrumental in pushing for a property tax for the city's schools in 2020, which historically had been underfunded.

References

External links 
Biography, Montgomery Mayor's Office
Campaign website
Steven L. Reed

 

Living people
African-American mayors in Alabama
Alabama Democrats
Alabama state court judges
Mayors of Montgomery, Alabama
Probate court judges in the United States
Year of birth missing (living people)
Morehouse College alumni
Vanderbilt University alumni
1970s births
African-American judges